Brøndby Municipality has in its history been a strong area for parties of the red bloc. In the 2019 Danish general election, it was the municipality where the bloc received the 3rd highest percentage of votes. Since 1966, the Social Democrats had held the mayor's position, and had won an absolute majority in all but one election from 1981 to 2017. 

In the 2017 election, the Social Democrats had won 11 seats, and the absolute majority made Kent Max Magelund mayor.

In this election, once again the Social Democrats would become the largest party and win an absolute majority. Therefore Kent Max Magelund was set to be mayor for his 2nd full term

Electoral system
For elections to Danish municipalities, a number varying from 9 to 31 are chosen to be elected to the municipal council. The seats are then allocated using the D'Hondt method and a closed list proportional representation.
Brøndby Municipality had 19 seats in 2021

Unlike in Danish General Elections, in elections to municipal councils, electoral alliances are allowed.

Electoral alliances  

Electoral Alliance 1

Electoral Alliance 2

Results

Notes

References 

Brøndby